Lotta Sea Lice is a collaborative studio album between Courtney Barnett and Kurt Vile, released on October 13, 2017, on Matador, Marathon Artists and Milk! Records. The album has received positive critical reviews.

Recording
Barnett and Vile announced that they had jammed together and decided to go on a mutual tour on June 7, 2017. They announced the release date and lead single "Over Everything" on August 30.

Reception

The album received three out of five stars from AllMusic's Stephen Thomas Erlewine, who praised some of the performance and fun of the album but concluded, "As they're both charismatic singers with a way with an elliptical melody, it's pleasant enough, but by the time its 45 minutes wrap up, Lotta Sea Lice feels like a party where the hosts are having a much better time than their guests."

Accolades

Track listing
"Over Everything" (Kurt Vile) – 6:19
"Let It Go" (Courtney Barnett) – 4:33
"Fear Is Like a Forest" (Jen Cloher) – 4:47
"Outta the Woodwork" (Barnett) – 6:21
"Continental Breakfast" (Vile) – 4:53
"On Script" (Barnett) – 3:59
"Blue Cheese" (Vile) – 4:37
"Peepin' Tom" (Vile) – 4:14
"Untogether" (Tanya Donelly) – 4:50

Personnel
Courtney Barnett – lead and backing vocals, guitars, piano
Kurt Vile – lead and backing vocals, guitars
Callum Barter – mixing, engineering
Greg Calbi – mastering
Mick Harvey – guitar, keyboards
Rob Laakso – electric bass, VI bass, baritone guitar, keyboards
Alex Landragin – guitar
Jade McInally – backing vocals
Stella Mozgawa – drums
Dave Mudie – drums, backing vocals
Jess Ribeiro – guitar, backing vocals
Bones Sloane – bass guitar, backing vocals
Mick Turner – guitar
Jim White – drums

Tour dates
The duo assembled a backing band called The Sea Lice composed of Janet Weiss, Stella Mozgawa, Rob Laakso, and Katie Harkin, with Jen Cloher as an opening act for all dates. The artists donated $1 from every ticket sale to the American Civil Liberties Union.

October 11 – House of Blues, San Diego, California, United States
October 14 – Cathedral Sanctuary at Immanuel Presbyterian Church, Los Angeles, California, United States
October 15 – Orpheum Theare, Los Angeles, California, United States
October 18 – Fox Oakland Theatre, Oakland, California, United States
October 20 – Arlene Schnitzer Concert Hall, Portland, Oregon, United States
October 21 – Moore Theatre, Seattle, Washington, United States
October 22 – The Showbox, Seattle, Washington, United States
October 25 – Palace Theatre, St. Paul, Minnesota, United States
October 26 – Rockefeller Chapel, Chicago, Illinois, United States
October 27 – Thalia Hall, Chicago, Illinois, United States
October 28 – The Empty Bottle, Chicago, Illinois, United States
October 30 – Royal Oak Music Theatre, Royal Oak, Michigan, United States
October 31 – Massey Hall, Toronto, Ontario, Canada
November 1 – Beacon Theatre, New York City, New York, United States
November 3 – Tower Theatre, Upper Darby, Pennsylvania, United States
November 4 – Orpheum Theatre, Boston, Massachusetts, United States
November 6 – Loew's Jersey Theatre, Jersey City, New Jersey, United States
November 7 – The Anthem; Washington, D.C.; United States
November 9 – Ryman Auditorium, Nashville, Tennessee, United States
November 10 – McFarlin Memorial Auditorium, Dallas, Texas, United States
November 11 – Austin City Limits Live at the Moody Theater, Austin, Texas, United States

Charts

References

External links
 
 Press release from Marathon Artists
 Press release from Matador Records
 NPR Music Tiny Desk Concert [20:05] performed live on 2017-12-08.
 Sea Lice by the Seaside Pitchfork Concert [51:08] performed live in Malibu, 2017

2017 albums
Collaborative albums
Courtney Barnett albums
Kurt Vile albums
Matador Records albums
Marathon Artists albums